D2B can mean:

 D2B (group), a Thai pop group
 D²B, a low-speed IEC serial bus standard for home automation applications
 Domestic Digital Bus (automotive), a high-speed isochronous ring network technology for automotive applications  
 Dual 2-back, a variation of the n-back mental exercise
 IBM Db2, a database